Sermilik is a fjord in eastern Greenland. It is part of the Sermersooq municipality.

The settlement of Tasiilaq is located about 15 km to the east of the mouth of the fjord.

Geography
{ "type": "ExternalData", "service": "geoshape", "ids": "Q3745834", "properties": { "fill": "#0050d0"}}

This fjord, whose Greenlandic name 'Sermilik' means 'place with glaciers' is located at the southern end of King Christian IX Land, west of Ammassalik Fjord. It is one of the largest fjords in the southeastern coast of Greenland. 
Its waters are fed by the Helheim Glacier, Fenris Glacier and Midgard Glacier among others. The fjord stretches inland in a roughly northern direction and splits into two branches at its head —at the southern limit of Schweizerland, the western one being the Helheim Fjord and the right one the Ningerti.

Sermilik's mouth is located between Kitak Island and Cape Tycho Brahe in the Denmark Strait area of the Atlantic Ocean. Kangersivartikajik is the next fjord to the east along the coast.
Near the fjord's entrance on the western side there is the island of Qeertartivatsiaq at the mouth of Johan Petersen Fjord and its eastern branch, the Stoklund Fjord. Sermilik is surrounded by jagged mountainous landscape and its coast is mostly very irregular and steep.

History
Initially Fridtjof Nansen had thought that Sermilik would offer a route up to reach the ice cap for his projected westward overland crossing.
On 3 June 1888 Nansen's party was picked up from the north-western Icelandic port of Ísafjörður by Norwegian sealer Jason. A week later the Greenland coast was sighted, but progress was hindered by thick pack ice.

The expedition left Jason "in good spirits and with the highest hopes of a fortunate result", according to Jason's captain. There followed days of extreme frustration for the party as, prevented by weather and sea conditions from reaching the shore, they drifted southwards with the ice. Most of this time was spent camping on the ice itself—it was too dangerous to launch the boats. On that day they finally reached land, but were too far south to begin the crossing. After a brief rest, Nansen ordered the team back into the boats and to begin rowing north. In the end Nansen finally began his crossing at Umivik Bay.

Gallery

See also
List of fjords of Greenland
Ammassalik Island
Kristian Kristiansen (explorer)
Sermilik Station
Sermiligaaq

Bibliography
Bjarne Grønnow, Jens Fog Jensen (2003). The Northernmost Ruins of the Globe. Museum Tusculanum Press. 
Mernild, S. H.; Liston, G. E.; Howat, I. M.; Ahn, Y.; Steffen, K.; Hasholt, B.; Jakobsen, B. H.; Fog, B.; van As, D., Freshwater flux to Sermilik Fjord, SE Greenland
  (First published in 1997 by Gerald Duckworth)

References

External links

Iceberg Collapse, Sermilik Fjord, East-Greenland
Hiking in Sermilik
Greenpeace - Sermilik

Fjords of Greenland

it:Egede Fjord